Jeffrey "Jeff" Gutteridge (born 28 October 1956) is an English former pole vaulter who represented Great Britain at two Summer Olympics. He was the national pole vault champion on several occasions.

Career
Gutteridge, who is from Slough, competed in the qualifying rounds of the 1976 Summer Olympics, the youngest athlete in the field at 19-years of age.

He represented England in the pole vault event, at the 1978 Commonwealth Games in Edmonton, Alberta, Canada. Four years later he represented England and won a silver medal at the 1982 Commonwealth Games in Brisbane, Queensland, Australia, behind Ray Boyd.

At the 1984 Summer Olympics he qualified for the final after registering a 5.30m jump in the preliminary rounds. In the final he successfully cleared 5.10m and finished in 11th position.

In 1988 he tested positive, while training, for anabolic steroids. He was given a life ban, which was later reduced.

References

External links
Jeff Gutteridge at Sports Reference

1956 births
Living people
English male pole vaulters
Olympic athletes of Great Britain
Athletes (track and field) at the 1976 Summer Olympics
Athletes (track and field) at the 1984 Summer Olympics
Athletes (track and field) at the 1978 Commonwealth Games
Athletes (track and field) at the 1982 Commonwealth Games
Commonwealth Games silver medallists for England
Commonwealth Games medallists in athletics
Doping cases in athletics
English sportspeople in doping cases
Sportspeople from Slough
Medallists at the 1982 Commonwealth Games